The  is a small, black, box-shaped hat traditional to Japan, which  (mountain ascetic hermits) of  wear on their foreheads. The  has been worn since the Kamakura period (1185–1333) or the Muromachi period (1336–1573).

and  

The  is one of the standard items which  wear as a uniform. These sacred items may guard them from the malicious spirits, thus they are safe in the deep forests. This style was established in the Kamakura or Muromachi period, and the contemporary  keep this tradition today.

Forms and symbolism 
The  is usually a small, black box-shaped hat, which is made of lacquered and hardened cloth or wood. The top of the  looks like a small round tower. It has the pentagonal box shape, and twelve folds surround this pentagon.

Its pentagonal form represents , the jeweled crown of the five wisdoms, which is the crown of the buddha Vairocana. Twelve folds represent ; the color black represents the kleshas of human beings.

Large-type  cover the head entirely.

and  

References 

Japanese headgear
Headgear
Shugendō
Religious clothing
Japanese words and phrases